The Spaulding Turnpike is a  north-south toll road in eastern New Hampshire. Nearly its entire length is overlapped by New Hampshire Route 16. Its southern terminus is at the Portsmouth Traffic Circle (Interstate 95 / U.S. Route 1 Bypass) in Portsmouth, a terminus it shares with U.S. Route 4 and NH 16. Its northern terminus is at an interchange with New Hampshire Route 125 in Milton, where NH 16 continues north as a full-access highway.  

The turnpike roughly parallels the Maine border. NH 16 was signed onto the Turnpike in the mid-1990s.

The turnpike is part of the New Hampshire Turnpike System operated by the New Hampshire Department of Transportation Bureau of Turnpikes.  Along with I-95 between the Massachusetts state border and the Portsmouth Circle (Blue Star Turnpike), the two turnpikes are collectively known as the Eastern Turnpike.

History
The turnpike is named for the Spaulding brothers of Rochester—Rolland H. Spaulding (1873–1942) and Huntley N. Spaulding (1869–1955)—who both served as Governor of New Hampshire. It was announced in August 1952 to connect Portsmouth and Rochester at a cost of $13.5 million. Work on the first section of the turnpike, between Portsmouth and Dover, started in 1954, with that segment opening in September 1956. The complete (as originally planned)  route between Portsmouth and Rochester opened on August 29, 1957, the same day that the Everett Turnpike was dedicated. Construction began in 1978, with the extension opening on August 20, 1981.

Route description
The Spaulding Turnpike begins in Portsmouth, at I-95 northbound Exit 4. Access from I-95 south and US 1 Bypass is facilitated via Exit 5 (Portsmouth Traffic Circle). A northbound-only exit connects with Brady Drive, accessible only from the traffic circle. The Spaulding Turnpike becomes a six lane freeway concurrent with US 4 and NH 16, with a  speed limit. Exit 1 in Newington provides access to Pease International Tradeport and the Newington malls.  

Exit 2, a northbound-only exit/entrance which facilitated access to the Mall at Fox Run and adjacent businesses, was closed permanently on July 19, 2015. Exit 3 is a full-access interchange with Woodbury Avenue, with a connection to Pease Tradeport via Arboretum Drive. Exit 4 provides access to Newington Village and businesses along Shattuck Way. The turnpike then crosses the Little Bay Bridge into Dover, with seven lanes (three northbound, and four southbound) for vehicles and a temporary pedestrian and bicycle path on the northbound shoulder of the bridge.     

Exit 5 provides access to Hilton Park and Wentworth Terrace. This exit was permanently closed when the northbound lanes were shifted onto the permanent northbound alignment of the turnpike on November 28, 2018.

The reconstruction of Exit 6 into a full access diamond interchange between Dover and Durham was open to traffic on November 15, 2019. Before the reconstruction, there was no access from eastbound US 4 to the northbound turnpike or Dover Point Road north, nor from the southbound turnpike to Dover Point Road north. Traffic then had to utilise the Spaulding Turnpike southbound and turn around at Exit 4 in Newington in order to access the Spaulding Turnpike northbound or Dover Point Road north.

North of the toll plaza, the freeway passes west of downtown Dover. Exits 7 through 9 provide local access via NH 108, NH 9 and Indian Brook Drive, respectively. A park and ride facility is located on Indian Brook Drive just off Exit 9.

A gap in the exit numbering—there is no Exit 10—allows for future addition of an interchange with more direct access to Somersworth; such an exit has been under consideration "since the turnpike was built in the 1950s".

The turnpike continues north and crosses into Rochester, reaching the second barrier toll soon after. Exit 11 provides access to Old Dover Road, for northbound traffic only. The freeway expands to six lanes north of Exit 12 and bypasses downtown Rochester to the west. US 202 joins the freeway at Exit 13, near the site of a park and ride facility built in 2014. NH 11 joins the turnpike  to the north at Exit 15. Both US 202 and NH 11 depart the turnpike at Exit 16 to East Rochester.

The highway continues north into Milton, with Exits 17 and 18 providing local access via NH 75 and NH 125. The Spaulding Turnpike designation ends at Exit 18 near Union; NH 16 continues north as a full-access highway.

Tolls 
Two barrier tolls are present on the Spaulding Turnpike—one in Dover and one in Rochester. Travel anywhere south of exit 6, north of exit 11, or between the barrier tolls (exits 7 through 9) is free of charge.

Electronic tolling
In November 2021, the New Hampshire Department of Transportation announced the installation of all-electronic tolling and collection of funds using E-ZPass transponders that are scanned by sensors for payment.

Toll rates 
Toll rates are determined by the class of vehicle (number of axles, single or dual rear tires). The NHDOT currently offers discounted tolls for customers utilizing E-ZPass transponders registered with the agency. The discount rates are 30 percent for Class 1-4 vehicles (single rear tires) and 10 percent for Class 5-12 vehicles (dual rear tires).

Exit list

Sourcing for old exit numbering:

Concurrent routes 
U.S. Route 4:  , Portsmouth to Dover
U.S. Route 202:  , Rochester
New Hampshire Route 11: , Rochester

See also

New Hampshire Highway System

References

Further reading
 
 Steve Anderson's BostonRoads.com: Spaulding Turnpike (NH 16)

Toll roads in New Hampshire
Two-lane freeways in the United States
U.S. Route 4